The Faith of Anna Waters is a 2016 American-Singaporean horror film starring American actors Elizabeth Rice and Matthew Settle and directed by Kelvin Tong. Billed as Singapore's first Hollywood supernatural feature, the film tells the story of an American journalist who travels to Singapore to investigate the mysterious suicide of her sister, and delves into one of Tong's favourite horror subgenres: exorcism.

The film was released on 6 May 2016 in the United States under the title The Offering.

Plot

American journalist Jamie Waters (Elizabeth Rice) travels to Singapore to investigate the mysterious suicide of her sister, Anna. However, her sister's death is only the beginning of a sinister demonic ancient plan.

Cast
Elizabeth Rice as Jamie Waters
Matthew Settle as Sam Harris 
Colin Borgonon as Father James De Silva 
Adina Herz as Katie Harris
Adrian Pang as Father Matthew Tan 
Jaymee Ong as Majorie Tan 
Pamelyn Chee as May Wong 
Tan Kheng Hua as Charlotte Sharma
Gus Donald as Danny Crowther

Reception

Distribution
The film has been bought for distribution in France, Germany, Spain, Mexico, Hong Kong, Taiwan, Thailand and the Philippines. In Mexico the film was scheduled to have a theatrical release on July 8, 2016.

References

External links 
 
 
 

2016 films
Singaporean horror films
2016 horror films
2010s English-language films